() is the most populated municipality in Finnmark in Troms og Finnmark county, Norway. The administrative centre of the municipality is the town of Alta. Some of the main villages in the municipality include Kåfjord, Komagfjord, Kvenvik, Langfjordbotn, Leirbotn, Rafsbotn, Talvik, and Tverrelvdalen.

Downtown Alta is located just below the 70th latitude and is closer to the North Pole than it is to much of Central Europe and the British Isles. The town is the northernmost settlement of urban significance in the European Economic Area, with municipalities north of it being sparsely populated. In spite of its high latitude the local climate is seldom severly cold thanks to Gulf Stream moderation in the prevailing wind. As a result of its shielded position leading to mild summers, the coastal areas of the municipality are warm enough to enable forestation. Due to Norway curving above its Nordic neighbours, Alta is located further east than almost all of Sweden and much of southern Finland. Being at a very high latitude, midnight sun and polar night are present for sizeable parts of the year.

The  municipality is the 7th largest municipality by area out of the 356 municipalities in Norway. Alta is the 60th most populous municipality in Norway with a population of 21,144.

General information

The municipality of Alten-Talvig was established on 1 January 1838 (see formannskapsdistrikt law). On 1 January 1863, the municipality was divided into two: Talvik to the north (population: 1,938) and Alta to the south (population: 2,442). On 1 January 1964, the two municipalities were merged back together to form the new, larger municipality of Alta. Prior to the merger, Alta had 6,629 residents and Talvik had 3,266 residents. The borders have not changed since that time.

On 1 January 2020, the municipality became part of the newly formed Troms og Finnmark county. Previously, it had been part of the old Finnmark county.

Name
The municipality (originally the parish) is named after the local Altafjorden. It could also be the Norwegianization of the Finnish word which refers to a "lowland". Prior to 1918, the name was written Alten.

Coat of arms
The coat of arms was granted on 9 July 1976. The official blazon is "Azure, a spearhead argent". This means the arms have a blue field (background) and the charge is a spear head. The spear head has a tincture of argent which means it is commonly colored white, but if it is made out of metal, then silver is used. The blue color in the field symbolizes the local river, sea, and mountains. The spear head is derived from the findings of quartzite spear heads dating back to the late Stone Age and found in the area. The quartzite was quarried in the municipality and tools made from it were used all over Northern Norway.

Churches
The Church of Norway has two parishes within the municipality of Alta. It is part of the Alta prosti (deanery) in the Diocese of Nord-Hålogaland.

History
The rock carvings at Alta, located near the Jiepmaluokta bay, dating from c. 4200 BC to 500 BC, are on the UNESCO list of World Heritage Sites. The Komsa culture was named after the Komsa mountain in Alta municipality, where the first archeological remains of this culture were discovered.

In the aftermath of the Sami Kautokeino rebellion of 1852, rebel leaders Mons Aslaksen Somby and Aslak Jacobsen Hætta were decapitated at Elvebakken in what is now the town of Alta on 14 October 1854.

Their bodies were buried in graves just outside the Kåfjord Church graveyard in the village of Kåfjord in Alta, but their heads were sent on to the Anatomisk Institute at the University of Oslo, where they were kept for more than a century as part of the university's skull collections. The two skulls were only relinquished by the university in 1985, following a controversy and protests by Sami activists, and were in November 1997 buried at the Kåfjord Church in Alta, at the same spot as their bodies were buried over 140 years earlier.

During World War II, the German battleship Tirpitz used the Kåfjorden, an arm of Altafjorden, as a harbour, and was damaged here by attacking Allied warplanes. The town Alta was seriously destroyed by fire near the end of the World War II. It was rebuilt in subsequent years.

The Altasaken in 1979 made headlines for weeks, as many people (especially Sami people and environmentalists) demonstrated and used civil disobedience to prevent the building of a dam on the river Altaelva in order to produce hydropower. The dam was built, however, and the river still offers good salmon fishing. The King of Norway usually visits the river once in the summer to fish.

The urban area made up of Bossekop, Elvebakken, and Bukta, also known collectively now as the town of Alta, became a town on 1 January 2000. The population has been growing steadily for many years.

Government
All municipalities in Norway, including Alta, are responsible for primary education (through 10th grade), outpatient health services, senior citizen services, unemployment and other social services, zoning, economic development, and municipal roads. The municipality is governed by a municipal council of elected representatives, which in turn elect a mayor.  The municipality falls under the Alta District Court and the Hålogaland Court of Appeal.

Municipal council
The municipal council  of Alta is made up of 35 representatives that are elected to four year terms. The party breakdown of the council is as follows:

Mayors
The mayors of Alta:

1838-1842: John Andreas Gill
1843-1845: Ellert Michael Ellertsen 	
1845-1847: Niels Frederik Julius Aars
1847-1849: Theodor Bergmann Borchgrevink 
1849-1851: Carl Norum 
1851-1853: Theodor Bergmann Borchgrevink 
1853-1855: Thomas Thomesen 
1855-1857: Theodor Bergmann Borchgrevink 
1857-1859: Lars Olsen Follum
1859-1861: Martin Heggelund Hjort Stuwitz 
1861-1863: Lars Olsen Follum 
1864-1865: Lars Follum 
1868-1871: Jørgen Næss 
1872-1875: O. Furu 
1876-1879: Lars Follum 
1880-1883: Lorents Holmgren 
1887-1890: Hjalmar C. Borchrevink 
1891-1901: Axel O. Hagemann
1902-1903: O. Andersen 
1904-1904: Ole Sætrum (acting)
1905-1907: August Nielsen
1908-1913: Hans Rusten
1914-1914: B. Siqveland
1915-1916: Waldemar Johansen
1917-1919: Kristian Heitmann (NSA)
1920-1922: Hans Rusten (H)
1922–1924: Johan Martin Mjøen (V)
1925-1925: B. K. Ottem (H)
1926-1928: Kristian Heitmann (NSA)
1929-1931: Paul Kjeldsberg (Ap)
1932-1934: Paul Tangen (LL)
1935-1937: B. Torbergsen (Ap)
1937-1940: William Granaas (NKP)
1941-1942: Odd Cappelen (NS)
1942-1944: Sverre A. Lyng (NS)
1945-1947: William Granaas (NKP)
1948-1951: Daniel Heitmann (Ap)
1952-1953: William Granaas (NKP)
1953-1955: Hans Kolle (acting) (Ap)
1955-1955: Hjalmar Bellika (acting) (Ap)
1956-1959: Jan K. Lund (Ap)
1960-1963: Karl Kivijervi (Ap)
1964-1968: Torleif Johansen 
1972-1978: Harald Mjøen (Ap)
1979-1983: Jakob Aarøen (V)
1983-1988: Odd Arne Rasmussen (Ap)
1988-1991: Lars Bakken (Ap)
1991–2001: Eva M. Nielsen (Ap)
2001–2011: Geir Ove Bakken (Ap)
2011–2015: Laila Davidsen (H)
2015–present: Monica Nielsen (Ap)

Geography
Alta is the second northernmost city in the world surpassing 10,000 inhabitants. On its way from the plateau down to the fjord, the river Altaelva has carved out the Sautso canyon, one of the largest canyons in Europe. The large Altafjorden has several notable bays and fjord arms that branch off from it including Langfjorden, Jiepmaluokta, Kåfjorden, and Lille Kufjorden.

Alta is based on the mainland of Norway, but it also includes parts of the islands of Stjernøya and Seiland. Seiland is the home of Seiland National Park where the Seilandsjøkelen glacier and the mountain Seilandstuva are located.

Several of the notable lakes in Alta include Iešjávri, Juovvajávri, Kovvatnet, and Stuorajávri.

In 2020, a landslide took 8 houses.

Climate
Most people live in the town of Alta, stretching along the inner part of the fjord. Alta has a sheltered boreal climate (Dfc) with long and dark winters, but still much less cold than expected for latitude 70 North. Daytime mid-summer temperatures are often fairly similar to coastal southern Norway, and lowland areas in Alta are mostly sheltered from the winter storms, which can be strong on the coast north of Alta. Precipitation is low, with a yearly average precipitation of only . The frequent clear skies are the reason why Alta early was chosen as an excellent location for studying the aurora borealis. The "midnight sun" is above the horizon from 18 May to 27 July, lasting a bit longer than the polar night from 26 November to 16 January. The average date for the last overnight freeze (low below ) in spring is May 14 and average date for first freeze in autumn is September 25 at Alta Airport (1981-2010 average) giving a frost-free season of 133 days.

Transportation
Alta is a transportation center in Finnmark. Alta Airport served 334,132 passengers in 2009. There are direct flights to Oslo, Tromsø, Vadsø, Kirkenes, Båtsfjord and Mehamn. The town of Alta also has port facilities in the town center, and European route E6 passes through Alta. The distance to southern Scandinavia is considerably shorter over European route E45 and northern Finland.

Economy
Main activities in Alta include trading, small industry, education, and public service. The town is also famous for its slate industry. Finnmark University College is situated in Alta, and there is also a research institution (Norut NIBR Finnmark). The town has the northernmost ice hotel in Europe.

Sports
Alta is home to the football club Alta IF. Cross-country skiing is very popular. Alta also has clubs for handball, track and field, alpine skiing, ice skating, taekwondo, and judo.

The bicycle race Finnmark Offroad, with 700- and 300-kilometer long courses, starts and ends in Alta.

Alta is the starting point for the Finnmarksløpet, a 500- and 1000- kilometer sled dog race—The longest sled dog race in Europe.

Notable people

 Henry Woodfall Crowe (1832 in Kåfjord–1865) British-Norwegian interpreter, translator and author
 Karl Akre (1840 in Alta – 1912) a Norwegian educator and politician
 Gustav Lund (1862 in Talvik – 1912) a Sámi travelling preacher, known as the sled preacher
 Egil Rasmussen (1903 in Bossekop – 1964) a Norwegian author, literature critic and pianist
 Kirsten Osen (born 1928 in Alta) a Norwegian anatomist, otologist and academic
 Johan Kjelsberg (1931 in Alta – 2012) a Norwegian stage actor 
 Henny Moan (born 1936 in Talvik) a Norwegian stage and cinema actress 
 Einar M. Bull (born 1942 in Alta) a Norwegian diplomat
 Tove Bull (born 1945 in Alta) a Norwegian linguist and academic
 Mikkel Gaup (born 1968 in Alta) a Sámi Norwegian film and stage actor 
 Laila Davidsen (born 1974 in Alta) a Norwegian politician, Mayor of Alta 2011 to 2015
 Inger Elin Utsi (born 1975) a Norwegian-Sami politician and actor, lives in Alta
 Tommy Wirkola (born 1979 in Alta) a Norwegian film director, producer and screenwriter of Finnish heritage

Sport 
 Bjørn Wirkola (born 1943 in Alta) a Norwegian former ski jumper
 Ove Wisløff (born 1954 in Alta) former breaststroke swimmer, competed at the 1976 Summer Olympics
 Jarle Pedersen (born 1955 in Kåfjord) a retired speed skater and current coach of the Norwegian speed skating team
 Morten Giæver (born 1982 in Alta) a Norwegian football midfielder with over 350 club caps
 Trond Fredrik Ludvigsen (born 1982 in Alta) a Norwegian footballer with nearly 200 club caps
 Tore Reginiussen (born 1986 in Alta) a Norwegian footballer with over 350 club caps
 Mads Reginiussen (born 1988 in Alta) a Norwegian footballer with over 300 club caps
 Finn Hågen Krogh (born 1990 in Alta) Norwegian cross-country skier
 Anna Odine Strøm (born 1998 in Alta) a Norwegian ski jumper

Twin towns – sister cities

Alta is twinned with:
 Apatity, Russia
 Boden, Sweden
 Oulu, Finland (1948)

See also
 Alta Museum

References

External links

 Alta Tourist Information
 Unesco information
 Høgskolen i Finnmark (Finnmark University College)
 Alta kommune 
 Alta Igloo Hotel
 Finnmarksløpet-the northernmost sled dog race in the world!
 Avinor:Alta Airport
 Pictures from Alta
 Øytun folk high school, Alta. Outdoor life

 
Municipalities of Troms og Finnmark
1863 establishments in Norway
Populated places of Arctic Norway